Firuz District is in Kowsar County, Ardabil province, Iran. At the 2006 census, its population was 6,798 in 1,466 households. The following census in 2011 counted 6,185 people in 1,647 households. At the latest census in 2016, the district had 4,628 inhabitants living in 1,389 households.

References 

Kowsar County

Districts of Ardabil Province

Populated places in Ardabil Province

Populated places in Kowsar County